Ercheia pulchrivenula is a species of moth of the family Erebidae. It is found in Thailand, Peninsular Malaysia, Sumatra and Borneo.

The species has been treated erroneously as a synonym of Ercheia pulchrivena by many authors.

References

External links
Species info

Moths described in 1938
Ercheiini